Vleuten is a former village in the Dutch province of Utrecht. Today, it is a neighbourhood of the city of Utrecht, and lies about 6 km west from the city centre. Vleuten has a railway station on the line between Utrecht and Woerden.

In 2001, Vleuten had 7434 inhabitants. The built-up area was 1.4 km2, and contained 2979 residences.
The statistical area "Vleuten" has a population of around 7090.

History
Vleuten used to be a separate municipality, until it merged with a number of other municipalities in 1954 to form Vleuten-De Meern. In 2001, that municipality merged with the municipality of Utrecht to become a city part of it.

References

Populated places in Utrecht (province)
Former municipalities of Utrecht (province)
Utrecht (city)